A fellow is a concept whose exact meaning depends on context.
In learned or professional societies, it refers to a privileged member who is specially elected in recognition of their work and achievements. 
Within the context of higher educational institutions, a fellow can be a member of a highly ranked group of teachers at a particular college or university or a member of the governing body in some universities (such as the Fellows of Harvard College); 
it can also be a specially selected postgraduate student who has been appointed to a post (called a fellowship) granting a stipend, research facilities and other privileges for a fixed period (usually one year or more) in order to undertake some advanced study or research, often in return for teaching services. 
In the context of research and development-intensive large companies or corporations, the title "fellow" is sometimes given to a small number of senior scientists and engineers. 
In the context of medical education in North America, a fellow is a physician who is undergoing a supervised, sub-specialty medical training (fellowship) after having completed a specialty training program (residency).

Education and academia
In education and academia there are several kinds of fellowships, awarded for different reasons.

Teaching fellowships

The title of (senior) teaching fellow is used to denote an academic teaching position at a university or similar institution and is roughly equivalent to the title of (senior) lecturer. The title (senior) fellow can also be bestowed to an academic member of staff upon retirement who continues to be affiliated to a university in the United Kingdom.

The term teaching fellow or teaching assistant is used, in the United States and United Kingdom, in secondary school, high school and middle school setting for students or adults that assist a teacher with one or more classes.

Medical fellowships

In US medical institutions, a fellow refers to someone who has completed residency training (e.g. in internal medicine, pediatrics, general surgery, etc.) and is currently in a 1 to 3 year subspecialty training program (e.g. cardiology, pediatric nephrology, transplant surgery, etc.).

Research fellowships

As an academic position

The title of research fellow may be used to denote an academic position at a university or a similar institution; it is roughly equivalent to the title of lecturer in the Commonwealth teaching career pathway.

As a financial grant
Research fellow may also refer to the recipient of academic financial grant or scholarship.
For example, in Germany, institutions such as the Alexander von Humboldt Foundation offer research fellowship for postdoctoral research and refer to the holder as research fellows, while the award holder may formally hold a specific academic title at their home institution (e.g., Privatdozent).

These are often shortened to the name of the programme or organization, e.g. Dorothy Hodgkin Fellow rather than Dorothy Hodgkin Research Fellow, except where this might cause confusion with another fellowship, (e.g. Royal Society University Research Fellowship.)

In the context of graduate school in the United States and Canada, a fellow is a recipient of a postgraduate fellowship. Examples include the NSF Graduate Research Fellowship, the DoD National Defense Science and Engineering Graduate Fellowship, the DOE Computational Science Graduate Fellowship, the Guggenheim Fellowship, the Rosenthal Fellowship, the Frank Knox Memorial Fellowship, the Woodrow Wilson Teaching Fellowship and the Presidential Management Fellowship. It is granted to prospective or current students, on the basis of their academic or research achievements.

In the UK, research fellowships are awarded to support postdoctoral researchers such as those funded by the Wellcome Trust and the Biotechnology and Biological Sciences Research Council (BBSRC). At ETH Zurich, postdoctoral fellowships support incoming researchers. The MacArthur Fellows Program (aka "genius grant") as prestigious research fellowship awarded in the United States.

Fellowships as a training program
Fellowships may involve a short placement for capacity building, e.g., to get more experience in government, such as the American Association for the Advancement of Science's fellowships and the American Academy of Arts and Sciences Fellowship programs. Some institutions offer fellowships as a professional training program as well as a financial grant, such as the Balsillie School of International Affairs, where tuition and other fees are paid by the fellowship.

Fellowships as a special membership grade

Fellows are often the highest grade of membership of many professional associations or learned societies, for example, the Chartered Institute of Arbitrators or Royal College of Surgeons. Lower grades are referred to as members (who typically share voting rights with the fellows), or associates (who may or may not, depending on whether "associate" status is a form of full membership). 
Additional grades of membership exist in, for example, the IEEE and the ACM.

Fellowships of this type can be awarded as a title of honor in their own right, e.g. the Fellowship of the Royal Society (FRS).
Exclusive learned societies such as the Royal Society have Fellow as the only grade of membership.

Appointment as an honorary fellow in a learned or professional society can be either to honour exceptional achievement or service within the professional domain of the awarding body or to honour contributions related to the domain from someone who is professionally outside it. Membership of the awarding body may or may not be a requirement.

How a fellowship is awarded varies for each society, but may typically involve some or all of these:
 A qualifying period in a lower grade
 Passing a series of examinations
 Nomination by two existing fellows who know the applicant professionally
 Evidence of continued formal training post-qualification
 Evidence of substantial achievement in the subject area
 Submission of a thesis or portfolio of works which will be examined
 Election by a vote of the fellowship

In ancient universities

At the ancient universities of the University of Oxford, the University of Cambridge, and Trinity College, Dublin, members of the teaching staff typically have two affiliations: one as a reader, lecturer, or other academic rank within a department of the university, as at other universities, and a second affiliation as a fellow of one of the colleges of the university.
The fellows, sometimes referred to as university dons, form the governing body of the college.  They may elect a council to handle day-to-day management. All fellows are entitled to certain privileges within their colleges, which may include dining at High Table (free of charge) and possibly the right to a room in college (free of charge).

At Cambridge, retired academics may remain fellows. At Oxford, however, a Governing Body fellow would normally be elected a fellow emeritus and would leave the Governing Body upon his or her retirement. Distinguished old members of the college, or its benefactors and friends, might also be elected 'Honorary Fellow', normally for life; but beyond limited dining rights this is merely an honour. Most Oxford colleges have 'Fellows by Special Election' or 'Supernumerary Fellows', who may be members of the teaching staff, but not necessarily members of the Governing Body.

Some senior administrators of a college such as bursars are made fellows, and thereby become members of the governing body, because of their importance to the running of a college.

In the U.S.

At Harvard University and some other universities in the United States, "fellows" are members of the Board of Trustees who hold administrative positions as non-executive trustee rather than academics.

Industry and corporate fellows

In industries intensive in science, medicine, and research & development,  companies may appoint a very small number of top senior researchers as corporate, technical or industry fellows, either in Science or in Engineering. These are internationally recognized leaders who are among the best in the world in their respective fields.

Corporate, Technical or Industry Fellow in either Science or Engineering is the most senior rank or title one can achieve in a scientific or engineering career, though fellows often also hold business titles such as Vice President or Chief Technology Officer.

Notable examples of fellows in scientific, medical and other research-intensive organizations include:

 Advanced Micro Devices (AMD) Fellows
 Apple Fellows
  Battelle Fellows
 Bell Labs Fellows
 Boeing Fellows
  DXC Technology Fellows
 DuPont Fellows
 Google fellows
 Henry Ford Technical Fellows
 HP Fellows
 IBM Fellows
 ICL Fellows
  Intel Fellows
 Microsoft Fellows
  NASA Fellows
 Oak Ridge National Laboratory (ORNL) Fellows
  RTI International fellows
  Toray Fellows
 Toshiba Fellows
  Raytheon Technologies

Nonprofit and government fellowships 
The title fellow can be used for participants in a professional development program run by a nonprofit or governmental organization.  This type of fellowship is a short term work opportunity (1–2 years) for professionals who already possess some level of academic or professional expertise that will serve the nonprofit mission.  Fellows are given a stipend as well as professional experience and leadership training.

See also

Honorary title (academic)
List of science awards

References

Academic administration
Education and training occupations
Industry and corporate fellows
E
Positions of authority
Leadership
Broad-concept articles